Eleni Daniilidou and Nicole Pratt were the defending champions, but Pratt did not compete this year. Daniilidou teamed up with Jennifer Russell and reached the quarterfinals, before being eliminated by Květa Peschke and Francesca Schiavone.

Cara Black and Rennae Stubbs won the final, defeating Elena Likhovtseva and Vera Zvonareva 6–3, 7–5 in the final.

Seeds

Draw

Draw

External links
 Main and Qualifying draws

2005 WTA Tour